Empress Lê may refer to:

Lê Thị Phất Ngân (died after 1028), wife of Lý Thái Tổ
Empress Linh Chiếu (1108–1161), wife of Lý Thần Tông
Dowager Empress Gia Từ (died 1381), wife of Trần Duệ Tông
Lê Ngọc Hân (1770–1799), wife of Quang Trung
Lê Ngọc Bình (1785–1810), wife of Nguyễn Quang Toản

Lê